Georges Van der Ton (born 28 March 1893, date of death unknown) was a Belgian equestrian. He competed in two events at the 1928 Summer Olympics.

References

External links

1893 births
Year of death missing
Belgian male equestrians
Olympic equestrians of Belgium
Equestrians at the 1928 Summer Olympics
Place of birth missing